Effusimentum is a genus of parasitic flies in the family Tachinidae. There are at least two described species in Effusimentum.

Species
Effusimentum petiolatum Barraclough, 1992
Effusimentum triangulum Barraclough, 1992

References

Dexiinae
Diptera of Australasia
Tachinidae genera